On 18 February 2009, Musa Khankhel, a Pakistani journalist was assassinated in Matta, Swat after reporting on the peace march of Sufi Muhammad, the leader of a Taliban group.

Khankel worked for Geo as a reporter for five years and was known as an "aggressive and courageous reporter".

References

2009 deaths
Assassinated Pakistani journalists
Geo News newsreaders and journalists
People from Swat District
Year of birth missing
Freedom of speech in Pakistan
Deaths by person in Pakistan
2009 murders in Pakistan
People murdered in Pakistan
Deaths by firearm in Pakistan
Human rights abuses in Pakistan